Archibald Kelly (9 December 1921 – 15 July 2005) was a Scottish footballer who played as a centre forward. He is best remembered for his time with Motherwell, his goals helping the side to their first victories in both the Scottish Cup and Scottish League Cup. He was born in Glasgow.

Playing career

Heart of Midlothian
Kelly joined Hearts from Arthurlie in 1942
and soon became a regular fixture in their wartime competition line-ups. Predominantly a centre forward, although occasionally deployed at outside left, he was a powerful, combative player, renowned for his bravery. A notable example of his determination occurred in a match against Kilmarnock during the 1946–47 season when, in an attempt to meet an errant cross, he collided with a goalpost at full stretch. The power of the impact shattered his collarbone but also cracked the wooden goal-frame! He was also a frequent goalscorer throughout his career, with a seven-goal haul in a 10–3 defeat of Albion Rovers in 1943 his most illustrious scoring feat.

Aberdeen

In December 1947, with Hearts struggling in the League, their manager Davie McLean moved to sign Aberdeen's Scottish international forward George Hamilton, with Archie Kelly and £8,000 going to Aberdeen in recompense. Despite playing only half a season for the Dons, Kelly finished the 1947–48 season as their top League scorer. The following season found Aberdeen battling against relegation and was also frustrating for Kelly on a personal level, as he struggled with a bad knee injury. Aberdeen's main problem was their porous defence; in contrast, with Kelly, Stan Williams, Harry Yorston and the returning George Hamilton, they had a surplus of attacking options and when Motherwell offered £7,000 for Kelly in November 1949, Aberdeen allowed him to leave.

Motherwell

Kelly quickly settled at Motherwell and scored four times when old side Aberdeen visited Fir Park later that season. Motherwell finished mid-table in 1948–49 and again the following year, however their cup form in 1950–51 was a revelation. They lost only one match en route to the 1950 Scottish League Cup Final, where they would meet Hibernian at Hampden. After an evenly balanced first half, Kelly opened the scoring, although his goal owed much to a mistake by Hibs goalkeeper Tommy Younger. Motherwell eventually won 3–0, securing only their second national trophy. The side also reached the Scottish Cup Final that year but succumbed 1–0 to Celtic.

Motherwell made amends for their Scottish Cup Final disappointment the next season, defeating Dundee comprehensively by 4–0. Kelly scored the final goal in front of the biggest crowd ever recorded for a domestic club match not involving the Old Firm.

Later career

Surprisingly, Motherwell suffered their first ever relegation the following year, although in an incredibly tight competition they finished only five points behind fourth-placed Hearts. Kelly was one of several big-name players to leave the club, joining perennial yo-yo team Stirling Albion in 1953. He helped the Binos  avoid relegation from the top division in 1953–54 before joining Second Division Ayr United in January 1955. He finished his career after a short stint with Cowdenbeath.

References

External links
Appearances at londonhearts.com

1921 births
2005 deaths
Aberdeen F.C. players
Ayr United F.C. players
Cowdenbeath F.C. players
Association football forwards
Heart of Midlothian F.C. players
Motherwell F.C. players
Footballers from Glasgow
Scottish Football League players
Scottish footballers
Stirling Albion F.C. players
Arthurlie F.C. players
Scottish Junior Football Association players